Sautatá is a locality in Riosucio Municipality, Chocó Department in Colombia. The administration of Los Katíos National Park is located in Sautatá.

Climate
Sautatá has a tropical monsoon climate (Am) with little rainfall from January to March and heavy rainfall in the remaining months.

References

Populated places in the Chocó Department